The 1905 Notre Dame football team was an American football team that represented the University of Notre Dame in the 1905 college football season. In its first season with Henry J. McGlew as coach, the team compiled a  record and outscored its opponents by a combined total 

The Wabash Little Giants traveled to South Bend on October 21 that year, and defeated Notre Dame  The upset is the Fighting Irish's only home-field loss in 125 games between 1899 and 1928.The next week, Notre Dame scored its most points in game ever, against American Medical, winning 142 to 0.

Schedule

Game summaries

North Division High School

Michigan Agricultural College

Footnote= 3 touchdown conversions were made, to make the score 28-0 in ND's favor.  But the knowledge on which touchdowns these extra points were completed on is a mystery.

Wisconsin

Wabash

American Medical College

DePauw

Indiana

Bennett Medical

Purdue

References

Notre Dame
Notre Dame Fighting Irish football seasons
Notre Dame football